Rodney Trafford (born November 29, 1978 in Morristown, New Jersey) is a former American football tight end in the NFL who has played for the Buffalo Bills and the New England Patriots.

Trafford grew up in Verona, New Jersey, and played his high school football at Delbarton School. Trafford was All State quarterback He played college football for Lou Holtz at the University of South Carolina.

Trafford has also been a member of the New England Patriots, Scottish Claymores, Buffalo Bills, Philadelphia Eagles, and St. Louis Rams.

Early years

Heart-stopping moment that saved Trafford
Trafford was in a car accident at 13 years old and was told he would never play again. His family fishing trip for Fathers Day turned out to be a blessing in disguise The fortunate part about the car accident is the doctors discovered a hole in his heart and irregular heartbeat.  Repaired at 13 and a year of recovery the doctors would not release him to play football.  Trafford found a doctor who would let him play with conditions. Trafford was forced to play with a Kevlar body suit to support his sternum, the material used in bulletproof vests, and for the next four years he had to take regular medication and return to the heart specialists for routine tests.

Trafford High school game, 1996 Delbarton's offensive attack is paced by quarterback Rodney Trafford (1,200 passing yards and 12 touchdowns), running back Jamaal Burcher (1,518 yards and 18 touchdowns) and wide receiver John Darden (24 receptions).

In 1996 the top young guns in this year's senior quarterback class in New Jersey are Edward Campbell of North Arlington, Darren Miller of St. Peter's Prep in Jersey City; Theodore Neals of Ferris in Jersey City, and Rodney Trafford of Delbarton in Morristown, New Jersey

Standout at Delbarton High School ... Played quarterback, throwing for more than 2,800 yards and 30 touchdowns during his career ... All-state his senior year ... Played in the North-South New Jersey all-star game ... His coach was John Kowalik.

September 1996, Trafford fueled Delbarton (5-2) past Wayne Valley High School (2-4), 39-6, with three passing touchdowns and one rushing. Trafford totaled 207 yards in the air and 80 on the ground.

Trafford, TE, Verona, NJ, 1997-2001 - high school QB walked on and became contributor and eventual starter at tight end; started 5 games in 2001; was thrown to 8 times and caught 6 for 4 first downs and a touchdown - the game winner in 37-36 victory over Alabama in 2001; played in the pros from 2003 through 2006 with Patriots, Bills, Eagles and Scottish Claymores of NFL Europe

College career

Trafford earned three varsity letters at University of South Carolina and finished his career with seven receptions for 37 yards…over his final two years, helped lead the Gamecocks to a 17-7 record and wins in the Outback Bowl following the 2000 and 2001 seasons…part of a reversal of fortunes for the University of South Carolina program, going from an 0-11 record as a sophomore to bowl wins as a junior and as a senior…saw action in all 24 games as a junior and senior…helped the University of South Carolina running game gain 2,378 yards in 2001, averaging 4.5 yards per carry…joined the squad as a walk-on quarterback, but redshirted as a freshman in 1997 and was converted into a tight end.
As a redshirted freshman Trafford catches the game-winning touchdown throw from Phil Petty against Alabama Crimson Tide to win 37 - 36.

1999 - Much-improved tight end prospect who came on towards the end of the year and impressed the coaches with his athletic savvy and his good hands in catching the football ... Saw action in nine games ... Had three catches for 14 yards ... Had a season-long reception of 13 yards in the season finale against Clemson ... Coaches believe he will contend for starting role in 2000.

2000 - Reserve tight end and special teams performer ... Saw action in all 12 games ... Had two receptions for 16 yards ... Converted a six-yard pass play into a key first down late in the victory over Georgia ... Was on the receiving end of a 10-yard pass from Kevin Sides on a fake field goal attempt against Vanderbilt that gave the Gamecocks a first down and led to an eventual touchdown.

Trafford recalls big-time catch

2001 - Senior tight end who has had a solid season … Has started four games and played in all 11 … His clutch seven-yard touchdown reception from Phil Petty with 1:39 remaining lifted USC to a dramatic comeback win over the University of Alabama. While that is his only catch of the season, it certainly is a big one, as the Gamecocks had to fight back from a 12-point fourth quarter deficit against the Alabama Crimson Tide. Has been a steady blocker … Good athlete who came to USC as a walk-on quarterback.

College statistics

University of South Carolina
Receiving

Career highlights: Pro

Trafford, a free agent, was not drafted when he finished college in 2002 and didn't play football last season. He was a camp director for 30 fourth-grade boys in Summit, N.J., did some sales work and research for his father's computer engineering firm, and also worked part-time for a publishing company.

2003 Trafford had a three-month Europe League experience with the Scottish Claymores will be used as a stepping stone towards NFL recognition. 2003 Scottish Claymore s Stats

Trafford helped the Scottish Claymores record a narrow win over Amsterdam Admirals - with his first touchdown since college. Trafford's score kept the Claymores on target to reach next month's World Bowl Final, and he believes his side are finding their form at the right time.  The tight end has now turned his thoughts to Saturday's game at Barcelona Dragons, and he said: "It feels as if we're peaking at the right time.  "For the last couple of years, the team that has won its final four games has gone to the World Bowl.  "We now have to think about facing Barcelona at the weekend, but this is a huge win."  The winning touchdown from Trafford on Saturday came with less than two minutes left.  With quarterback Craig Nall leading the offence with great maturity—he finished with 313 yards and three touchdown passes—the Claymores led 24-10 at half-time.

Receiving/Rushing statistics

Passing statistics

Trafford out to continue turnaround
Scottish Claymores Game Tight end Rod Trafford grabbed two passes, a tremendous 24-yard catch with a hand in his face and a five-yarder in the end zone to make the score 31–20 with less than two minutes to play. Dyshod Carters interception of Hill with 42 seconds to play iced the game and the Claymores emerged victorious 31–20.

The New England Patriots signed him in January and allocated him to the Scottish Claymores in NFL Europe. The 6-3, 245-pound northern New Jersey native had 23 catches in 10 games for the Claymores, but playing in NFL Europe forced him to miss the Patriots' minicamps and passing camps, putting him behind the other rookies. He didn't get his first look at the Patriots' playbook until he flew to Boston from Scotland.  Trafford stated "the complexity of the playbook'' the most staggering thing about training camp in the National Football League.

Buffalo Bills signed tight end Rod Trafford to the practice squad 11/19/03. Allocated to NFL Europe for its 2003 season and drafted by the Scottish Claymores with their 11th pick in the Allocated Player Draft. Signed his first NFL contract (1/17/03) with the New England Patriots after going undrafted and remaining out of football in 2002.

2004: Signed by the Bills on Dec 8 after the team placed TE Mark Campbell on injured reserve…picked up off the Philadelphia Eagles’ practice squad which he was on since Week 2…made his NFL debut four days later and caught his first career pass for 10 yards vs. Cle. (12/12)…played in a reserve role at tight end at Cin. (12/19)…made one reception for five yards at SF (12/26)…also tallied two unassisted special teams tackles…caught one pass for 10 yards vs. Pit. (1/2/05)…also registered two assisted special teams stops.

Receiving/Rushing statistics

Receiving by games played

Awards

 Trafford earned All-State honors his senior year at Delbarton School.

Personal life

Rod Trafford joined Florida branch of Harbor Branch Oceanographic Institute Institute in the role marketing manager. His focus will be to market and amplify the important fieldwork projects being completed by Post Docs, P.I.'s and Graduate Students while increasing developmental funds through raising awareness and support of Harbor Branch research. He was most recently with Xenith LLC as a Xenith LLC Southeast Regional Sales Manager.

At Xenith LLC Rod Trafford raised concerns about the helmets players were wearing. "The players maybe aren't wearing the correct size helmet maybe they're not being fit properly. There could be some design flaws," said Rod Trafford, a former NFL player and now southeast regional sales manager for Xenith, the newest major helmet maker. "It seems the past two or three years, it's become an epidemic." Increased number of flying helmets raises concerns

2009 Trafford made the cover of Delbarton School Today while at Xenith in an article "Defending the Brain" (pg 29) 

2014 Trafford became a Master Trainer and Ambassador to teach and reinforce USA Football's Heads Up Football. That same year Trafford joined Prodeco Technologies is an ever-growing electric bicycle manufacturer as an Executive Account Director 

Trafford joined Pazoo.com January 12, 2015 as a Health and Wellness expert writing about sports safety.

2015 Trafford joined i1 Biometrics, Inc. as a Regional Sales Manager to help with the growing epidemic of undiagnosed sports brain injuries.

Activities

2005 Trafford Tackles Waves In Costa Rica The Buffalo Bills tight end wasted no time once the NFL season ended. One week after the Super Bowl, he packed his bags, got on a plane with a friend, and headed to Tamarindo, Costa Rica, a tiny city on the country's pacific coast that is known for its spectacular waves.

2013 Delbarton Catches Parros '98 in a Panthers Game

References

1978 births
American football tight ends
Buffalo Bills players
Delbarton School alumni
New England Patriots players
Philadelphia Eagles players
Living people
People from Morristown, New Jersey
People from Verona, New Jersey
South Carolina Gamecocks football players